Kakaletri is a village in the municipality of Oichalia, Messenia, Peloponnese, Greece.

The name is related to the Greek family name "Kakaletris", which is often met in places around the village, including Pyrgos (Elis), Kalamata (Messenia) and Sparti (Laconia).

Populated places in Messenia